"Growing of My Heart" is a song recorded by Japanese singer and songwriter Mai Kuraki, which she released as the lead single from her sixth album, Diamond Wave (2006). The song was written by Kuraki herself, Aika Ohno and Takeshi Hayama and released on November 9, 2005.

"Growing of My Heart" was a commercial success, reaching number seven in Japan and selling approximately 62,000 copies. The song served as the sixteenth opening theme to the Japanese television anime series, Case Closed.

Track listing

Charts

Weekly charts

Monthly charts

Certification and sales

|-
! scope="row"| Japan (RIAJ)
| 
| 62,299
|-
|}

Release history

References

2005 singles
2005 songs
Mai Kuraki songs
Giza Studio singles
Case Closed songs
Songs written by Aika Ohno
Songs written by Mai Kuraki
Song recordings produced by Daiko Nagato